Radomir (Cyrillic script: Радомир) is a Slavic origin given name. The etymology of the original form of the name, Radomer, is from rat - old Slavonic for war - and mer "merit, ability", i.e. "able warrior". However, modern popular understanding in most Slavic languages would link the name to rad "care, joy, love" and mir "peace, world, fame". Feminine form: Radomira. Nicknames: Radek, Radko, Mirek, Mirko, Rado, Racho, Radka (f), Mirka (f). The usual nickname derived from Radomir is Rasha. The name is very popular in Bulgaria and Serbia

List of people with the given name Radomir
Gavril Radomir of Bulgaria, medieval tsar
Radomir Antić, Serbian former football defender and former football manager for the Serbian national team
Radomir Đalović, Montenegrin football player
Radomir Lazović, Serbian politician and activist
Radomir Mihajlović, Serbian rock guitarist, also known as Točak
Radomir Putnik, Serbian Field Marshal (vojvoda) and Chief of General Staff in the Balkan Wars and World War I
Radomir Reljić, Serbian painter
Radomír Šimůnek (disambiguation) Sr. and Jr., father and son Czech cyclo-cross cyclists
Radomira "Radka" Zrubáková, Slovakian retired professional tennis player

See also
Radomir (disambiguation)
 Radimir Čačić, Croatian politician

External links
Behind the Name: Radomir

Slavic masculine given names
Croatian masculine given names
Czech masculine given names
Bulgarian masculine given names
Macedonian masculine given names
Montenegrin masculine given names
Slovak masculine given names
Slovene masculine given names
Polish masculine given names
Serbian masculine given names